This is a list of universities in Bahrain.

Public universities and higher education institutions 

 Arabian Gulf University
 Bahrain Polytechnic 
 College of Health Sciences
 University of Bahrain

Private universities and higher education institutions

 Applied Science University 
 Arab Open University
 AMA International University
 American University of Bahrain
 Vatel Hotel & Tourism Business School
 Ahlia University
 Bahrain Institute of Banking and Finance
 British University of Bahrain
 Gulf University
 Kingdom University
 Royal College of Surgeons in Ireland (RCSI) - Bahrain
 Royal University for Women 
 Talal Abu Ghazaleh University College of Business
 University College of Bahrain

References 

Bahrain education-related lists
Bahrain
Bahrain